Silver Springs Airport  is two miles southwest of Silver Springs, in Lyon County, Nevada. It is owned by Lyon County and leased to Silver Springs Airport, LLC.

Most U.S. airports use the same three-letter location identifier for the FAA and IATA, but this airport is SPZ to the FAA and has no IATA code (IATA assigned SPZ to Springdale Municipal Airport in Springdale, Arkansas).

History
The airport was built by the United States Army Air Forces about 1942, and was known as Churchill Flight Strip.  It was an emergency landing airfield for military training flights. It closed after World War II, and was turned over for local government use by the War Assets Administration.

Facilities

For the 12-month period ending May 30, 2007, the airport had 4,000 general aviation aircraft operations, an average of 333 per month. 14 aircraft were based at this airport, 50% single-engine and 50% ultralight.

The airport started improvements in 2016, including jet fuel support.

References

Other sources

 
 Shaw, Frederick J. (2004), Locating Air Force Base Sites History's Legacy, Air Force History and Museums Program, United States Air Force, Washington DC, 2004.

External links
   from Nevada DOT
 Aerial photo as of June 1994 from USGS The National Map via MSR Maps
 

Airports in Nevada
Transportation in Lyon County, Nevada
Buildings and structures in Lyon County, Nevada
Airports established in 1942
Airfields of the United States Army Air Forces in Nevada
Flight Strips of the United States Army Air Forces
World War II airfields in the United States
1942 establishments in Nevada